Charnon Ki Dasi is a Bollywood film. It was released in 1941. It was directed by Gajanan Jagirdar.

References

External links
 

1941 films
1940s Hindi-language films
Indian black-and-white films
Films directed by Gajanan Jagirdar